Derzhava may refer to:

 Derzhava (Russian party), a Russian populist, nationalist party founded by Alexander Rutskoy
 Derzhava (Ukrainian party), a Ukrainian political party that formed a coalition with the Progressive Socialist Party of Ukraine after the Orange Revolution
 Derzhava (yacht), an 1871 royal yacht employed by the Tsar of Russia
 The Ukrainian State (Українська держава, Ukrajinśka Deržava)
Derzhava, a merchant ship crewed by Mariusz Zaruski
 Derzhava, a bank in Russia